The 2014–15 Montpellier HSC season was the 40th professional season of the club since its creation in 1974. The club celebrated their 40th anniversary with a change to the club badge representing a '40' in its center, which was used during the 2014–15 season.

First team squad 

French teams are limited to four players without EU citizenship. Hence, the squad list includes only the principal nationality of each player; several non-European players on the squad have dual citizenship with an EU country. Also, players from the ACP countries—countries in Africa, the Caribbean, and the Pacific that are signatories to the Cotonou Agreement—are not counted against non-EU quotas due to the Kolpak ruling.

Out on loan

Competitions

Ligue 1

League table

Results summary

Results by round

Matches

Coupe de la Ligue

Coupe de France

References

Montpellier HSC seasons
Montpellier